Azhagiya Pandipuram is a 2014 Indian Tamil-language comedy film directed by N. Rayan. The film stars Elango Nagarajah and Anjena Kirti with a supporting cast including Manobala, Fathima Babu, M. S. Bhaskar, Sriman, Subbu Panchu, Meera Krishnan, Devadarshini, and Yuvarani. The film, produced by N. Kirubakaran under the banner of Thaimann Production, had music by Bharadwaj, editing by Suresh Urs, and cinematography by V. Akilan. The film released on 5 December 2014 to mixed reviews.

Plot
Madhavan (Elango Nagarajah), a young man, lives with his joint family: parents (Keeripulla (Manobala) and Fathima Babu), brother (Sriman) and sister-in-law (Yuvarani). His family has a feud with their opposite house family (M. S. Bhaskar, Subbu Panchu, Meera Krishnan and Devadarshini). Pambukutty's daughter Deepika (Anjena Kirti) was into a boarding school in Ooty for 10 years, where she completes her education and comes back to her native. Deepika's family decides to get her married off, while Keeripulla also wants his son to get married. Soon, Madhavan and Deepika fall in love with each other. What transpires next forms the rest of the story.

Cast

Elango Nagarajah as Madhavan
Anjena Kirti as Deepika
Manobala as Keeripulla
Fathima Babu as Madhavan's mother
M. S. Bhaskar as Pambukutty
Sriman as Veera Dayalan
Subbu Panchu
Meera Krishnan
Devadarshini
Yuvarani as Madhavan's sister-in-law
Crane Manohar
Risha as Aattakkari Manimekalai
Sankar as Vela
Appu K. Sami
Muthukaalai
Scissor Manohar
Nellai Siva
K. Sivasankar
Agnes Sonkar
Sakthivel
Ravishanth
Doctor Kalidas
Sathya
Ilamaran
Jeyambabu
Daas Kathir
Risha (special appearance in "Orekkannale")
Agnes Padu (special appearance in "Kattazhagi Nanappa")

Soundtrack 
The soundtrack was composed by Bharadwaj.

Production
The film was shot in the Theni, Karaikkudi and Kodaikanal areas in Tamil Nadu.

Reception 
Malini Mannath of The New Indian Express opined that "The film is like a stage play, at times like a low-end TV serial. There is no distinct characterisation, with the whole lot behaving in a juvenile manner. It’s a tirade of non-stop dialogues with no respite".

References

External links
 Azhagiya Pandipuram

Indian comedy films
2014 films
2014 comedy films
2010s Tamil-language films
Films scored by Bharadwaj (composer)